The 2018–19 Rice Owls women's basketball team represented Rice University during the 2018–19 NCAA Division I women's basketball season. The Owls, led by fourth year head coach Tina Langley, played their home games at the Tudor Fieldhouse and were members of Conference USA. They finished the season 28–4, 16–0 in C-USA play to win the C-USA regular season championship. They also won the C-USA women's tournament to earn an automatic trip to the NCAA women's tournament which was their first trip since 2005. They lost in the first round to Marquette in an overtime thriller. With 28 wins, they finished with the most wins in school history.

On February 18, 2019, the Owls entered the AP Top 25 at No. 25. It was the Owls' first time being ranked in the AP Poll in program history. Rice won the Conference USA tournament championship game over Middle Tennessee, 69–54. Nancy Mulkey was named the tournament's Most Valuable Player.

Roster

Schedule

|-
!colspan=9 style=| Non-conference regular season

|-
!colspan=9 style=| Conference USA regular season

|-
!colspan=9 style=|Conference USA Women's Tournament

|-
!colspan=9 style=|NCAA Women's Tournament

Rankings

See also
2018–19 Rice Owls men's basketball team

References

Rice Owls women's basketball seasons
Rice
Rice